Podalia contigua is a moth of the Megalopygidae family. It was described by Francis Walker in 1866.

References

Moths described in 1866
Megalopygidae